J. A. D. Rozier was the 30th mayor of New Orleans (March 19, 1866 – March 20, 1866).

Mayors of New Orleans